Amy Stokes Barton (October 1, 1841–March 19, 1900), a pioneer woman ophthalmologist, was born in Camden County, New Jersey, October 1, 1841, daughter of Joseph Barton, a farmer, and Rachel B. Evans.

She graduated at the Woman's Medical College of Pennsylvania in 1874, and after serving a term in the hospital connected with the college, began practicing medicine in Philadelphia. She became interested in the eye, and after some difficulties, because of her gender, she was admitted to work in the Wills Eye Hospital, and assisted George Strawbridge for thirteen years, until his resignation in 1890.

She was lecturer on ophthalmology, 1885– 1890, and clinical professor of ophthalmology, 1891–1897, in the Woman's Medical College.

Dr. Barton collected the money for and founded a dispensary in connection with the Woman's College in Philadelphia, feeling that too much stress was being put upon the teaching of obstetrics and gynecology to women, and wishing a place where clinics in all branches would be held; it was opened in 1895 at 1212 South Third Street, and was later at 333 and 335 Washington Avenue, being called the Amy S. Barton Dispensary.

She was an Orthodox Friend. She died in Philadelphia, March 19, 1900, from apoplexy.

External links 

 The Barton Dispensary - The Encyclopedia of Greater Philadelphia

Woman's Medical College of Pennsylvania faculty
American ophthalmologists
1841 births
1900 deaths
People from Camden County, New Jersey
Woman's Medical College of Pennsylvania alumni
Women ophthalmologists